Laura Lise Valette (born 16 February 1997) is a French athlete specialising in the sprint hurdles. She won a gold medal at the 2014 Summer Youth Olympics and a bronze at the 2015 European Junior Championships.

Her personal bests are 13.04 seconds in the 100 metres hurdles (-0.4 m/s, Lille 2017) and 8.13 seconds in the 60 metres hurdles (Nantes 2017).

International competitions

References

 

1997 births
Living people
French female hurdlers
Sportspeople from Loire-Atlantique
Athletes (track and field) at the 2014 Summer Youth Olympics
World Athletics Championships athletes for France
French Athletics Championships winners
Youth Olympic gold medalists for France
Athletes (track and field) at the 2018 Mediterranean Games
Competitors at the 2017 Summer Universiade
Youth Olympic gold medalists in athletics (track and field)
Mediterranean Games competitors for France
Athletes (track and field) at the 2020 Summer Olympics
Olympic athletes of France
21st-century French women